AH Basic is a discount brand of everyday commodities developed, marketed and introduced by the Ahold group, to replace the Euro Shopper discount brand in all Albert Heijn stores in Belgium, Germany and the Netherlands from April 2013 to 2014.

History 

In April 2013, Ahold was not satisfied with the quality of the Euro Shopper brand, which was introduced by the Sourcing AMS group in 1995. Ahold promises a better quality and price for their Dutch and Belgian customers under the new AH Basic brand.

ICA AB has also announced to phase out Euro Shopper branded products, replacing them with their own brand ICA Basic for Sweden.

See also 
 Euro Shopper
 Ahold
 Albert Heijn

References 

Belgian brands